Front and Center – Live from New York is the third live album by American singer-songwriter Beth Hart, 13 years since her first solo concert album, released on April 13, 2018 by Provogue. It was recorded at a live performance at the music venue Iridium Jazz Club in New York City, United States. A DVD was released with the CD. The performance also was featured on the Season 8 premiere episode of public television's concert series, Front and Center.

Track listing
CD

DVD
Front and Center Show

Full Band Bonus Content

Acoustic Bonus Content

Additional Bonus Content

Personnel

Musicians
 Beth Hart – vocals, piano, acoustic guitar, bass
 Jon Nichols – electric guitar, acoustic guitar, backing vocals
 Bill Ransom – drums
 Bob Marinelli – bass
 Sonny Landreth (special guest) – guitar

Production
 Don Maggi – executive producer
 Denis Gallagher – executive producer
 Ken Sturm – executive producer
 Ron Sturm – executive producer
 Christine Davies Reagan – supervising producer
 Grace Blake – producer
 Lance McVickar – director, recording engineer, mix engineer,  camera operator, editor
 William E. Gastfield III – backup audio recording
 Erik Kohlhoff – assistant audio engineer
 Chris Gilroy Editor – assistant audio engineer
 Alex Petrai – lighting
 Miles Adgate – camera
 Nick Vega – camera
 Patrick Heaphy – camera
 Megan Dovico – production assistant
 Jim Belmont – photographer
 Roy Koch – graphic design
 Willem Heijnen – graphic design

References

Beth Hart albums
2018 live albums